Andre Morgan is an American film and movie producer and financial consultant.

Early life and education 
Morgan was born in a French military hospital in Rabat, Morocco while his father served as a Petty Officer in the U.S. Navy. As the family moved yearly to posts around the world, he attended multiple schools in Europe, England and the United States.  In 1963, his father retired as the Navy’s then most senior-ranking enlisted man. Before taking a position with the U.S. Air Force Chart and Information Center in St. Louis, he moved his wife and son to Overland Park, Kansas.

American Film Market 
In 1981, with colleagues Bobby Meyers, Robbie Little, Mark Damon, Andy Vajna and Mario Kassar, Morgan co-founded the American Film Market (AFM), an annual event in Santa Monica, California where film and television professionals meet to sell, finance and acquire films.

Ruddy Morgan Organization 
Morgan cofounded the Ruddy Morgan Organization (RMO) with Albert S. Ruddy. RMO produced over 40 films and 400 hours of television, including the film The Cannonball Run, as well as the television series Martial Law and Walker: Texas Ranger.

China Film and Television 
After selling his interest in Golden Harvest in 1984, Morgan returned to China in 2000. He was the driving force in the creation of Hweilai Studios in Shanghai – the first private sector studio in China, opened in 2001. Hweilai produced not only Chinese content, but also English-language movies and television.

Since launching RMO in China in 2000, Morgan has produced Chinese-language films. In 2002 he also executive produced Flatland, the first Sino-American television series. In 2005, he was the Executive Producer on the first Sino-American film co-production – Merchant Ivory’s The White Countess, starring Ralph Fiennes and Vanessa Redgrave. His production of Peter Chan’s Perhaps Love, the first Chinese musical in 25 years, was chosen as Hong Kong’s 2006 Oscar entry, winning 22 international awards, including 6 Hong Kong Film Awards. In 2007, the epic The Warlords, starring Jet Li, Andy Lau and Takeshi Kaneshiro, garnered 17 awards and 19 nominations, including Best Picture at the Hong Kong Film Awards. He also produced multiple television series in China.

Acting Roles
Among the roles Morgan had as an actor, one was as in the 1973 martial arts film, When Taekwondo Strikes which starred Jhoon Rhee, Carter Huang, Angela Mao Ying, Hwang In-shik, Kazama Kenji and Anne Winton. He played the part of Father Louis, a French priest whose niece Marie / Mary (played by Winton) is a student of the resistance leader Ri Jun-dong (played by Jhoon Rhee). He is arrested by the Japanese and taken to prison cells below a Karate School. As well as producing the 1975 film The Man from Hong Kong which starred Jimmy Wang Yu, George Lazenby and Frank Thring, Morgan also had a small role in the film as a gunman.

Filmography
He was a producer in all films unless otherwise noted.

Film

As an actor

Miscellaneous crew

As writer

Production manager

Thanks

Television

References

External links
 Luke Ford: Interview with Andre Morgan
 
 Andre Morgan interview on Al Jazeera English

Year of birth missing (living people)
Living people
American film producers
People from Rabat
University of Kansas alumni